The truncated tetrakis cube, or more precisely an order-6 truncated tetrakis cube or hexatruncated tetrakis cube, is a convex polyhedron with 32 faces: 24 sets of 3 bilateral symmetry pentagons arranged in an octahedral arrangement, with 8 regular hexagons in the gaps.

Construction
It is constructed from taking a tetrakis cube by truncating the order-6 vertices. This creates 4 regular hexagon faces, and leaves 12 mirror-symmetric pentagons.

Hexakis truncated octahedron
The dual of the order-6 truncated triakis tetrahedron is called a hexakis truncated octahedron. It is constructed by a truncated octahedron with hexagonal pyramids augmented.

See also 
 Truncated triakis tetrahedron
 Truncated triakis octahedron
 Truncated triakis icosahedron

External links 
 George Hart's Polyhedron generator - "t6kC" (Conway polyhedron notation)

Polyhedra